List of free analog and digital electronic circuit simulators, available for Windows, macOS, Linux, and comparing against UC Berkeley SPICE.

Some of the following simulators don't include a graphical visual interface, so a separate program must be chosen to provide that feature, such as Qucs-S, Oregano, or a PCB suite that supports external simulators, such as KiCad or gEDA.

See also

 List of HDL simulators for VHDL, Verilog, SystemVerilog, ...
 Espresso heuristic logic minimizer, such as Logic Friday
 Comparison of EDA software
 List of instruction set simulators

References

Free simulation software